William Dennison Stephens (December 26, 1859 – April 25, 1944) was an American federal and state politician. A three-term member of the U.S. House of Representatives from 1911 to 1916, Stephens was the 24th governor of California from 1917 to 1923. Prior to becoming Governor, Stephens served as the 27th Lieutenant Governor of California from 1916 to 1917, due to the death of John Morton Eshleman, and served a brief time as Mayor of Los Angeles in 1909 due to the resignation of Arthur C. Harper.

As Governor, he was a Progressive who kept the reforms made by his predecessor, Hiram Johnson, and remained visible throughout his governorship. He lost a bid for re-election in 1922 to California State Treasurer Friend Richardson, who campaigned on a conservative platform.

Early life and career
Stephens was born in Eaton, Ohio, on December 26, 1859. He was the third child out of a total of nine children born to Martin and Alvira Stephens. With ambitions to become a lawyer, Stephens studied earnestly in law to become a lawyer, yet family fortunes required all of his earnings to go to his family instead.

Following his graduation from Eaton High School in 1876, Stephens had worked for three years as a school teacher before joining the railroad business to become an engineer. Between 1880 and 1887, Stephens helped survey the construction of railroads in Ohio, Indiana, Iowa and Louisiana. His days in the railroads came to an end in 1887 when his mother, Alvira, now falling ill, sought a hot and drier climate to improve her health. The Stephens family, including William, relocated to Los Angeles that year, though Alvira would be dead within a year.

After relocating to Los Angeles, Stephens began to work as a traveling salesman and later as a grocery manager. In 1891, Stephens married Flora E. Rawson (1869–1931). In 1902, he became a partner in Carr and Stephens Groceries, giving Stephens wide name recognition throughout Los Angeles. Increasingly, Stephens became involved in business and municipal politics, serving on the board of directors of the Los Angeles Chamber of Commerce from 1902 to 1911, as well as being elected to the Los Angeles Board of Education from 1906 to 1907. Stephens further served on the Los Angeles Board of Water Commissioners, working alongside William Mulholland in an advisory committee for the construction of the Los Angeles Aqueduct.

In 1906, Stephens served briefly as a major in the California Army National Guard during the San Francisco earthquake as part of the First Brigade. In 1909, he became vice president of the American National Bank.

Following Los Angeles Mayor Arthur C. Harper's resignation from office shortly before a crucial recall election, Stephens was appointed Mayor of the city on March 15, 1909, becoming the city's 27th mayor. Stephens' mayoralty lasted for less than two weeks before George Alexander, the winner of the election, assumed the office.

After his brief stint as Mayor of Los Angeles, Stephens entered the realm of federal politics. In the 1910 elections, Stephens was elected as a Republican for the 7th congressional district to the U.S. House of Representatives. Due to redistricting, Stephens changed constituencies to the newly created 10th congressional district for the 1912 elections, which he also won. During this time period, Stephens increasingly identified himself as a member of the Progressive movement, becoming a member of the Progressive Party, led by former president Theodore Roosevelt and California Governor Hiram Johnson. Stephens was one of the 13 Progressives to be elected to the U.S. House of Representatives in the 1910s, four of which (including himself) came from California. He successfully defended his seat again in the 1914 elections, winning a consecutive third term to the House. Stephens would continue to identify himself as a member of the Progressive Party until the party's dissolution in 1916, when he rejoined the Republican Party.

Following Lieutenant Governor John Morton Eshleman's death from tuberculosis on February 28, 1916, Governor Hiram Johnson sought a replacement for his subordinate. By mid-year, Johnson had selected Stephens as Eshleman's successor, forcing him to resign his seat from the federal House and assume the position of lieutenant governor on July 22.

Stephens' position as lieutenant governor was short lived. Governor Johnson himself was elected to the U.S. Senate in the 1916 elections, leaving the governorship open to the recently installed lieutenant governor. Johnson submitted his resignation to take his Senate seat on March 15, 1917, with Stephens, fulfilling his duties as lieutenant governor, to assume the governorship, making him the state's 24th governor.

Governorship
 
Nearly immediately, Stephens faced controversy regarding the Preparedness Day Bombing, a terrorist attack on the San Francisco Preparedness Day parade on July 22, 1916. The attack was blamed on left wing radicals, in particular former Industrial Workers of the World member Thomas Mooney, and his alleged accomplice, Warren Billings. Both Mooney and Billings were convicted, though critics said later that the trial was conducted in a lynch mob atmosphere. Governor Stephens supported both convictions. However, international sympathy for Mooney quickly spread, making him one of the United States's most famous political prisoners. There was national and international pressure on Stephens to intervene for Mooney. President Woodrow Wilson personally telegraphed Stephens to ask him to review the case against Mooney. Stephens yielded, but only slightly, commuting Mooney's death sentence to life imprisonment.

Despite this slight clemency, militant labor radicals continued to pressure Stephens, resulting in threats, and eventually, actions of violence. On the evening of December 17, 1917, a dynamite bomb exploded at the foot of the Governor's Mansion in Sacramento. Although Stephens was not injured, the explosion caused considerable damage to the kitchen. Radicals from the IWW were later blamed for the attack. In an unrelated threat, labor radicals also threatened to destroy both the California State Capitol and the Governor's Mansion if a $50,000 ransom was not met.

Stephens responded to threats from labor radicals, and to subversion worries during World War I, with the California Criminal Syndicalism Act, targeting radical labor unionists and their advocacy of violent confrontation with state authorities. Despite numerous threats on his life and state property, Stephens refused to pardon Thomas Mooney for the remainder of his administration. Mooney was eventually pardoned by left-wing Democratic governor Culbert Olson in 1939.

A Progressive like his predecessor Hiram Johnson, Stephens chose not to expand on the reforms made by Johnson. Instead, Stephens sought to keep the electoral and bureaucratic reforms already put in place.

In the 1918 state general elections, Stephens won renomination for the Republican Party, campaigning on a platform to solidify Progressive reforms within the state government. He easily won the election, trouncing independent and former Democratic candidate Theodore A. Bell by a 20% margin of the vote. Other candidates included Republican Mayor of San Francisco James Rolph, who appeared as a write-in candidate at 3%, and Henry H. Roser of the Socialist Party of America with 4.2%.

After his successful election to the governorship to a full four-year term, Stephens grew increasingly concerned over the needs of returning World War I  veterans. Stephens argued that the state government had a mandate to provide benefits for returning veterans, such as government-sponsored retraining and funds to help re-employment. Through his advocacy, a veteran assistance program was established. During the same time period, Stephens also supported state and federal prohibition of alcohol.

Like his predecessor Hiram Johnson, Stephens remained highly suspicious of Asian immigration to California, especially from Japan, which he viewed as an increasingly belligerent nation. In 1919, Stephens openly urged the California State Legislature to enact stricter exclusion laws to restrict Japanese immigrants. He declared that the influx of Japanese was a threat not only to California but to the United States. Through the remainder of his governorship, Stephens sought the aid of other governors and public officials to restrict Japanese immigration. In part, some of his goals were realized by the federal Immigration Act of 1924.

Despite threats on his life, Stephens remained publicly visible throughout his governorship. He was part of the general welcoming committee when Edward, Prince of Wales, arrived aboard  in San Diego Bay in 1920, during the future British monarch's first visit to California. Stephens was also present when his daughter, (Barbara) Mrs. Randolph T. Zane, ceremonially launched the battleship .

During his governorship, Stephens realized his lifelong dream by passing the California Bar to become a lawyer.

In the final months of his governorship, Stephens vetoed bills that would deregulate state utilities, vowing to keep Johnson's Progressive reforms.

In 1922, Stephens sought another term as governor. However, Republican ranks had grown decidedly more conservative since 1918. He lost the Republican gubernatorial primary election, to California State Treasurer Friend Richardson.

Later life
After failing in his bid for renomination, Stephens returned to Los Angeles to establish a law practice. He would never again hold public office, though he remained active in public affairs.

He died on April 25, 1944, at Santa Fe Hospital in Los Angeles of a heart ailment. He was 84 years old. He is interred in Angelus-Rosedale Cemetery, Los Angeles.

References

External links

Governors of California profile of William Stephens
Internet Accuracy Project profile of Governor William Stephens
 Los Angeles in the 1900s: Mayor William D. Stephens, obituaries and photos

}

1859 births
1944 deaths
People from Eaton, Ohio
Republican Party members of the United States House of Representatives from California
Progressive Party (1912) members of the United States House of Representatives from California
Republican Party governors of California
Mayors of Los Angeles
San Francisco Bay Area politicians
Presidents of the Organising Committees for the Olympic Games
Burials at Angelus-Rosedale Cemetery